These are the official results of the Men's Pole Vault event at the 1994 European Championships in Helsinki, Finland, held at Helsinki Olympic Stadium on 9 and 11 August 1994.  There were 27 participating athletes, with two qualifying groups.

Results

Qualification
Held on 9 August 1994Qualification: 5.65 metres (Q) or at least 12 best athletes advance to the final

Final
Held on 11 August 1994

Participation
According to an unofficial count, 27 athletes from 17 countries participated in the event.

 (1)
 (1)
 (1)
 (1)
 (3)
 (3)
 (3)
 (1)
 (1)
 (1)
 (1)
 (1)
 (1)
 (3)
 (2)
 (2)
 (1)

See also
 1990 Men's European Championships Pole Vault (Split)
 1991 Men's World Championships Pole Vault (Tokyo)
 1992 Men's Olympic Pole Vault (Barcelona)
 1993 Men's World Championships Pole Vault (Stuttgart)
 1995 Men's World Championships Pole Vault (Gothenburg)
 1996 Men's Olympic Pole Vault (Atlanta)
 1997 Men's World Championships Pole Vault (Athens)
 1998 Men's European Championships Pole Vault (Budapest)

References

 Results

Pole vault
Pole vault at the European Athletics Championships